This is a list of tables of the oldest people in the world in ordinal ranks. To avoid including false or unconfirmed claims of old age, names here are restricted to those people whose ages have been validated by an international body dealing in longevity research, such as the Gerontology Research Group (GRG) or Guinness World Records (GWR), and others who have otherwise been reliably sourced.

The longest documented and verified human lifespan is that of Jeanne Calment of France (1875–1997), a woman who lived to age 122 years and 164 days. She claimed to have met Vincent van Gogh when she was 12 or 13. She received news media attention in 1985, after turning 110. Calment's claim was investigated and authenticated by Jean-Marie Robine and Dr Michel Allard for the GRG. Her longevity claim was put into question in 2018, but the original assessing team stood by their judgement.

As females live longer than males on average, women predominate in combined records. The longest lifespan for a man is that of Jiroemon Kimura of Japan (1897–2013), who lived to age 116 years and 54 days.

The oldest living person in the world whose age has been validated is -year-old Maria Branyas of Spain, born 4 March 1907. The world's oldest known living man is -year-old Juan Vicente Pérez of Venezuela, born 27 May 1909.

Academics have hypothesized the existence of a number of blue zones around the world where people live longer than average.

Ten oldest verified people ever 
 

Systematic verification of longevity has only been practiced since the 1950s and only in certain parts of the world. All ten oldest verified people ever are women.

Oldest people

Oldest men 

a Mortensen was born in Denmark.
b Gerneth was born in Stettin, then part of the German Empire, now in Poland and renamed Szczecin.

Ten oldest living people

Oldest living people 

c Branyas was born in the United States.

Oldest living men

Chronological list of the oldest known living person since 1955 
This table lists the sequence of the world's oldest known living person from 1955 to present, according to GRG research. Due to the life expectancy difference between sexes, nearly all the oldest living people have been women (thus the maximum life span is guided by the female numbers); a sequence of the oldest living men is provided below the main list.

Chronological list of the oldest living man since 1973 
This table lists the sequence of the world's oldest known living man from 1973 to present.

References

 
Gerontology

Oldest organisms
Record progressions

sv:Lista över världens äldsta människor